HBD, or Hemoglobin subunit delta, is a protein that in humans is encoded by the HBD gene.

HBD may also refer to:

 HBD Venture Capital, a business incubator and venture capital founded by Mark Shuttleworth
 Station code for Hoshangabad railway station, Madhya Pradesh, India
 HB Dudelange, a handball club from Dudelange, Luxembourg
 HBD, Higher Banking Diploma offered by Emirates Institute for Banking and Financial Studies
 "HBD (Birthday Mo)", a song by Skusta Clee
 HBD, Howard Brothers Discount Stores
 Health Biotechnology Division (HBD), of the National Institute for Biotechnology and Genetic Engineering
 Hdb, IMA symbol for Humboldtine
 HBD, helicase binding domain, a domain of the DNA primase DnaG
 HbD, Hemoglobin D-Punjab

See also
 Human biodiversity (disambiguation)
 Happy Birthday (disambiguation)